Gambe, a village in the Tola-Binyeri District of the Mayo-Belwa local government area of Adamawa State in the North Eastern region of Nigeria, is an ancient settlement dating back to about the seventeenth century about 1750AD. Founded by Gangve the first Chief of Gambe. From whose name is drived the Corrupted pronunciation Gambe not to be confused with Gombe.

Minerals
Gambe village contains a range of minerals including barite, agate, quartz, sapphire, ruby, tourmaline and fossils.

PEOPLE

Gambe is the home to the  Chamba people, a tribe in Nigeria's North East region. It is also the village of the first Chamba University graduate: Saadu Abubakar Gambe.

The village has a Primary School and a Junior Secondary School.

Populated places in Adamawa State